is a village located in Minamikawachi District, Osaka Prefecture, Japan. , the village had an estimated population of 4,970 in 2267 households and a population density of 130 persons per km².

Geography
Chihayaakasaka is located in the far southeast corner of Osaka Prefecture, bordered by the Yoshino region of Nara to the east. Most of the village area is mountainous and forested, and is within the borders of the Kongō-Ikoma-Kisen Quasi-National Park.

Climate
Chihayaakasaka has a Humid subtropical climate (Köppen Cfa) characterized by warm summers and cool winters with light to no snowfall.  The average annual temperature in Chihayaakasaka is 13.9 °C. The average annual rainfall is 1636 mm with September as the wettest month. The temperatures are highest on average in August, at around 26.0 °C, and lowest in January, at around 2.4 °C.

Neighboring municipalities
Osaka Prefecture
Tondabayashi
Kawachinagano
Kanan
Nara Prefecture
 Gojō
Gose

Demographics
Per Japanese census data, the population of Chihayaakasaka peaked in the 1990s and has been declining since.

History
The area of the modern village of Chihayaakasaka was within ancient Kawachi Province, and became famous in the late Kamakura and Nanboku-chō periods as the home territory of the imperial loyalist, Kusunoki Masashige. Various fortifications from that period, notably Shimo-Akasaka Castle, Kami-Akasaka Castle and Chihaya Castle on the slopes of Mount Kongo were the sites of important battles in the 14th century. The villages of Chihaya and Akasaka were established within Ishikawa District with the creation of the modern municipalities system on April 1, 1889.  On April 1, 1896 the area became part of Minamikawachi District, Osaka. The two villages merged on September 30, 1956 to form the village of Chihayaakasaka.

In 1893, Akasaka, Kumatarō Kido and Yagorō Tani murdered 10 people, and left one infant alive. They then killed themselves after the murders.

On March 1, 2008 Chihayaakasaka requested a merge into the adjacent city of Kawachinagano, after talks of merging with the surrounding towns of Kanan and Taishi fell through. These plans were also rejected due to strong public opposition on August 14, 2009.

Government
Chihayaakasaka has a mayor-council form of government with a directly elected mayor and a unicameral village council of seven members. Chihayaakasaka collectively with the cities of Tondabayashi and Ōsakasayama, and other municipalities of Minamikawachi District contributes two members to the Osaka Prefectural Assembly. In terms of national politics, the village is part of Osaka 15th district of the lower house of the Diet of Japan.

Economy
Chihayaakasaka was traditionally dependent on agriculture (notably shiitake) and forestry. The area suffers from an aging population and rural depopulation.

Education
Chihayaakasaka has two public elementary schools and one public middle schools operated by the village government. The village does not have and a high school.

Transportation

Railway
Chihayaakasaka does not have any passenger rail service. The nearest station is Kawachinagano Station or Tondabayashi Station.

Highway

Local attractions
Chihaya Castle ruins, a National Historic Site
Kami-Akasaka Castle ruins, a National Historic Site
Shimo-Akasaka Castle ruins, a National Historic Site
Mount Kongō, the highest mountain in Osaka Prefecture
Kongō Range, a mountain range on Chihayaakasaka's eastern border

References

External links

Chihaya Akasaka official website 
 Chihaya Akasaka Tourism Association

Villages in Osaka Prefecture
 Chihayaakasaka